Bowness may refer to:

People
Alan Bowness (1928–2021), British art historian and former director of the Tate Gallery
Felix Bowness (1922–2009), English comedy actor
Moses Bowness (1833–1894), Victorian photographer
Peter Bowness, Baron Bowness (born 1943), British Conservative politician
Rick Bowness (born 1955), assistant coach for the Vancouver Canucks and former Canadian National Hockey League leftwinger
Tim Bowness (born 1963), English singer with No-Man and other projects
William Bowness (1809–1867), English artist and poet

Places
Bowness-on-Windermere, a town in the Lake District of Cumbria, England
Bowness-on-Solway, a village in Cumbria on the Anglo-Scottish border
Bo'ness, a town in Scotland
Bowness, Calgary, a former town in Canada, now a neighbourhood of Calgary